Neolamprologus bifasciatus is a species of cichlid endemic to Lake Tanganyika where it is usually found at depths from 30 to 45 meters at the bottom edge of the rocky habitat where it meets the sandy and or muddy substrate. It is rarely found in water less than 30 meters deep. it is most often seen by itself.    This species can reach a length of  TL.  This species can also be found in the aquarium trade.

References

Büscher, H. H., 1993. Neolamprologus bifasciatus n. sp.: ein neuer Tanganijkasee-Cichlide (Cichlidae, Lamprologini). D.A.T.Z. 46(6):385–389.

bifasciatus
Taxa named by Heinz Heinrich Büscher
Fish described in 1993
Fish of Lake Tanganyika